Charlotte is a female given name, a female form of the male name Charlot, a diminutive of Charles. It is of French origin meaning "free man" or "petite". The name dates back to at least the 14th century. King Charles II of England had two illegitimate daughters with the name, the second wife of King Louis XI of France was Charlotte of Savoy, and Charlotte de Bourbon-La Marche (1388-1422) was Queen of Cyprus. Other names for Charlotte are Charlie, Lottie, Lotte, Carlota and Carlotta.

These women are usually identified as Charlotte with an appended title rather than a surname:

Princess Charlotte of Wales (b. 2015)
Charlotte Stuart, Duchess of Albany (1753–1789)
Charlotte, Grand Duchess of Luxembourg (1896–1985)
Charlotte, Princess Royal, later Queen Charlotte of Württemberg (1766–1828)
Charlotte of Belgium, Empress of Mexico (1840–1927)
Charlotte of Bourbon, Queen of Cyprus (1388–1422)
Charlotte of Cyprus, Queen of Jerusalem and Armenia (1444–1487)
Charlotte FitzRoy, Countess of Yarmouth (1650–1684)
Charlotte Lee, Countess of Lichfield (1664–1718)
Charlotte of Mecklenburg-Strelitz ("Queen Charlotte"), the queen consort of George III (1744–1818)
Charlotte of Savoy, wife of Louis XI of France (1441–1483)
Charlotte Aglaé d'Orléans, Duchess of Modena and Reggio by marriage (1700–1761)
Charlotte Amalie of Hesse-Kassel (or Hesse-Cassel), Queen of Denmark (1650–1714)
Charlotte Christine of Brunswick-Wolfenbüttel, Tsarevna of Russia (1694–1715)
Princess Charlotte, Duchess of Valentinois, Princess of Monaco (1898–1977)
Charlotte Casiraghi, Monégasque socialite; eleventh in line to the Monégasque throne (b. 1986)
Princess Charlotte Augusta of Wales, only legitimate child of George IV of the United Kingdom (1796–1817)
Archduchess Charlotte of Austria (1921–1989)
Amber O'Neal, a professional wrestler, who has also performed under the ring name Charlotte (b. 1974)
Princess Charlotte (disambiguation), several women with the name
Queen Charlotte (disambiguation), several women with the name

Popularity
According to Social Security Administration, Charlotte was the 31st most popular girl name in 2013 in the United States. 
It was the most popular name for girls in Australia in 2013. The same year it was the 21st popular girl name both in England and Wales, having been a constant presence among the top 10 girls names there since the 1980s.

Notable people

Charlotte Ainslie (1863-1960), Scottish educationalist and headmistress
Charlotte Emma Aitchison, British singer known as Charli XCX
Charlotte Armstrong, American author
Charlotte Auerbach, German scientist
Charlotte Arnold, Canadian actress
Charlotte Ayanna (born 1976), Puerto Rican-American actress and former Miss Teen USA
Charlotte Fowler Baldwin (1805 – 1873), American missionary
Charlotte Becker, German cyclist 
Charlotte Beers, American businesswoman and former Under Secretary of State
Charlotte Bellis, New Zealand journalist
Charlotte Blacklock (1857–1931), British suffragette, given a Hunger Strike Medal
Charlotte Brontë, English author (generally recognized for Jane Eyre)
Charlotte Buff (1753 - 1828), a youthful acquaintance of the poet Goethe
Charlotte Bunch, activist and author
Charlotte Burton, American silent film actress 
Charlotte Caffey, musician (formerly of The Go-Go's)
Charlotte Church, Welsh musician
Charlotte Colbert, Franco-British multi-media artist
Charlotte Reeve Conover (1855 - 1940), American author, lecturer, political activist and educator
Charlotte Corday, revolutionary and assassin
Charlotte Cornwell, English actress
Charlotte Covell, British actress, writer and producer (known as Charlie Covell)
Charlotte Dawson, Australian television personality
Charlotte d'Amboise, Broadway actress and dancer
Charlotte de Sauve, noblewoman, mistress and spy
Charlotte Dod, English athlete
Charlotte Dujardin, dressage rider
Charlotte Edwards, former professional cricketer who was captain of the England women's team
Charlotte Egerton, Countess of Bridgewater (1763–1849), British noblewoman and philanthropist
Charlotte Elliott, English poet, hymnwriter, editor 
Charlotte Famin (born 1973), French wheelchair tennis player
Charlotte Flair, American professional wrestler, author and actress
Charlotte Forten Grimké, anti-slavery activist and educator
Charlotte Frank, architect
Charlotte Fullerton, TV writer and author  
Charlotte Gainsbourg, English-French actress and singer
Charlotte Evelyn Gay, English social and temperance reformer
Charlotte A. Gray, English educator and temperance leader
Charlotte E. Gray, American author
Charlotte Greenwood, American actress and dancer 
Charlotte Harris (artist), painter
Charlotte Hatherley, English musician
Charlotte Hawkins Brown, American educator
Charlotte Henshaw, British Paralympic full-time athlete across multiple disciplines
Charlotte Hope, English actress
Charlotte Jackson, British television presenter and journalist 
Charlotte Johnson Wahl, British artist and mother of Boris Johnson, Jo Johnson, and Rachel Johnson
Charlotte Ann Fillebrown Jerauld, American poet, story writer
Charlotte Jordan, English actress
Charlotte Kalla, Swedish cross-country skier
Charlotte Lawlor (1878 - 1941), New Zealand poet, writer and advertising designer
Charlotte Laws, politician, author, TV host, anti-revenge porn activist
Charlotte Lecocq (born 1977), French politician
Charlotte Lennox, English author and poet
Charlotte Lewis, English actress
Charlotte Martin, American musician
Charlotte Maxeke (1871-1939), South African social and political activist
Charlotte McKinney, American model and actress
Charlotte P. Morris, American academic administrator
Charlotte Nichols, British Labour politician
Charlotte Payne (born 2002), British hammer thrower
Charlotte Perkins Gilman, American writer and socialist
Charlotte Perriand, French architect and designer
Charlotte Pistorius (1777 – 1850), German poet
Charlotte Sally Potter, film director and screenwriter (known as Sally Potter)
Charlotte Prodger (born 1974), British video artist
Charlotte Rae, American actress and singer
Charlotte Rampling, English actress
Charlotte E. Ray, attorney and teacher, first African-American woman to become a lawyer 
Charlotte Rhead, ceramics artist
Charlotte Roche, author and television presenter 
Charlotte Salomon, German artist
Charlotte Schreiber, Canadian artist and illustrator
Charlotte Scott, British mathematician
Charlotte Sheffield (1936-2016), American actress, model and beauty pageant titleholder
Charlotte Smith (basketball), basketball player and coach
Charlotte De Bernier Taylor, American entomologist
Charlotte Teske, athlete
Charlotte Tilbury, make-up artist
Charlotte Smith (writer), English poet and novelist
Charlotte Uhlenbroek, British zoologist and television presenter
Charlotte Wahl, Latvian philanthropist
Charley Webb, actress
Lady Charlotte Wellesley, British socialite
Charlotte Fowler Wells, American phrenologist, publisher 
Charlotte Wells, 21st-century Scottish film director
Charlotte Frances Wilder, American writer
Charlotte Wessels, Dutch singer-songwriter
Charlotte de Witte, Belgian DJ and record producer

Fictional characters

Charlotte Heywood, main character in the Jane Austen novel Sanditon
Charlotte DiLaurentis, a former antagonist in Pretty Little Liars
Charlotte Fairchild, a character in The Infernal Devices, part of The Shadowhunter Chronicles by Cassandra Clare
Charlotte Gray, Scottish protagonist in the novel Charlotte Gray
Charlotte (Making Fiends), a character in Making Fiends
Charlotte York Goldenblatt, a main character in Sex and the City played by actress Kristin Davis
Charlotte Lewis, a secondary character in the now completed ABC show, Lost, portrayed by Rebecca Mader.
Charlotte A. Cavatica, the spider, from E. B. White's Charlotte's Web and film adaptations
Charlotte Christine de Colde, a character of the Samurai Shodown video game series by SNK
Charlotte "Charlie" Duncan, a character on Disney Channel's Good Luck Charlie, portrayed by Mia Talerico
Charlotte E. Yeager, a character from the anime/manga Strike Witches
Charlotte Watsford, a character from H2O: Just Add Water
Charlotte King, a character in Private Practice
Charlotte Beaumont, a character in the Australian television drama All Saints
Charlotte Pickles, a character on Nickelodeon's 1990s animated series Rugrats, voiced by Tress MacNeille
Charlotte Usher, main character in Ghostgirl
Charlotte Doyle, main character in The True Confessions of Charlotte Doyle
Charlotte Simmons, main character in I Am Charlotte Simmons
Charlotte "Charlie" Emily, main character in the book Five Nights at Freddy's: The Silver Eyes
Charlotte, main character in the book The Sorrows of Young Werther
Charlotte, main character in the film Lost in Translation, portrayed by Scarlett Johansson
Charlotte, main character in the film The Woman in Red, portrayed by Kelly LeBrock
Charlotte Makepeace, main character in "Charlotte Sometimes (novel)" by Penelope Farmer, and the song Charlotte Sometimes (song) by the British Rock band The Cure.
Charlotte Gibson, Gibby's mother in iCarly
Charlotte, a character in Orphan Black portrayed by Cynthia Galant
Charlotte "Charlie" Magne, the protagonist of Hazbin Hotel
Charlotte Linlin, a character from the anime and manga One Piece
Charlotte Wiltshire, a main character in game series Hello, Charlotte!

See also

Charlotta
Sharlotte Lucas

References

Feminine given names
Irish feminine given names
Scottish feminine given names
Dutch feminine given names
German feminine given names
Norwegian feminine given names
Swedish feminine given names
Danish feminine given names

fr:Charlotte